Henry Patrick Lardner-Burke  (1916-1970) was a South African flying ace of World War II, credited with 7.5 'kills'.

Enlisting in the Royal Air Force, he started light training in early 1940. In 1941 he was posted to 19 Squadron, after which he joined 46 Squadron in May 1941. In June 1941 the squadron moved to Malta. 
On 8 November 1941 hit by a 12.7 mm round just behind left armpit, after leaving most of itself inside, it came out about quarter inch from his left nipple, it pierced the armour plating of his Hurricane BD789 behind. He was hit and shot down from close behind at an angle by Machci fighter. He tried to bale out, but failed and managed to land safely in Malta. Injury was serious and put him out of the action for several months.

His DFC citation reads:
In November 1941, this officer was the pilot of one of 4 aircraft which engaged a force of 18 hostile aircraft over Malta and destroyed 3 and seriously damaged 2 of the enemy’s aircraft. During the combat Pilot Officer Lardner-Burke, who destroyed 1 of the enemy’s aircraft, was wounded in the chest and his aircraft was badly damaged. Despite this, he skillfully evaded his opponents and made a safe landing on the aerodrome; he then collapsed. Throughout the engagement, this officer displayed leadership and courage of a high order. He has destroyed 5 enemy aircraft over Malta.

In May 1942 he joined Gunnery Instruction Training Wing until March 1943, when he received new posting to 222 Squadron as a Flight Commander. On 27.8.43 he claimed 1-0-1 Fw 190 on 18.30-20.10 sortie flying Spitfire MH434/ZD-B. He was flying as Red 3 and at first damaged one, later shot down Fockerwulf that crashed near Audruicq. F/O Hasselyn (Blue 3) claimed Fw 190 destroyed 10–15 m N. of Guines flying MH428 and F/O Otto Smik (Red 4) flying MH430 claimed the third as destroyed and his pilot baled out. That Fockerwulf attempted to attack Burke. We know, that 8./JG 26 lost two Fw 190s with both pilots baled out successfully. On 8 September he was flying as Blue 1 and with F/O Smik (Blue 2, MH390) attacked leading enemy fighter aircraft. It was seen to crash S.E. of Boulogne sur Mer by P/O T. Willie (Blue 3, MH491). They both claimed Me 109F destroyed. We only know that JG 26 loss doesn't fit in time and place. The same situation was with two Fockerwulfs.

In April 1944 he was appointed Officer Commanding of No. 1 Squadron RAF and in December 1944 of RAF Church Fenton
He was awarded a bar to his DFC in February 1945.

Post war
After the war he moved to the Isle of Man and died in 1970.

References

South African World War II flying aces
1916 births
1970 deaths
South African military personnel of World War II
Recipients of the Distinguished Flying Cross (United Kingdom)